Peretti is an Italian or Corsican surname which may refer to :

Achille Peretti (artist) (1857–1923), Italian painter, sculptor and anarchist
Achille Peretti (1911–1983), French politician
Aldo Maria Brachetti Peretti (born 1932), chairman of the Italian company API Group
Alessandro Peretti di Montalto (1571–1623), Italian Catholic Cardinal
Carlo Peretti (born 1930), Italian water polo player
Chelsea Peretti, American writer and comedian
Cynthia Peretti (1948−2009), American wrestler and trainer, known as "Princess Jasmine"
Diego Peretti (born 1963), Argentine actor and psychiatrist
Elsa Peretti (1940–2021), Italian jewelry designer
Felice Peretti (1521–1590), pope as Pope Sixtus V
Ferdinando Brachetti Peretti (born 1960), chairman and CEO of API Group
Francesco Peretti di Montalto (1597–1655), Italian Catholic Cardinal
Frank E. Peretti (born 1951), American novelist
Giovanni Pietro Perti (1648–1714), Italian Baroque sculptor and architect
Hugo Peretti (1916–1986), American songwriter and record producer
Jacques Peretti (born 1967), investigative reporter, broadcaster and filmmaker
Jean-Marie Peretti, French teacher-researcher in human resources management
Jonah Peretti (born 1974), American Internet entrepreneur
Lucia Peretti (born 1990), Italian short-track speed-skater
Marianne Peretti (born 1927), Franco-Brazilian artist
Osvaldo Peretti (born 1921), Argentine football player
Roberto Peretti (born 1966), Italian short track speed skater
Ugo Brachetti Peretti (born 1965), Italian oil executive
Vanessa Peretti (born 1986), model and Miss Venezuela International 2006

Italian-language surnames